James Ellis (born 1948) is an American swim coach who founded the PDR (Philadelphia Department of Recreation, or Pride, Determination, Resilience) swim team in Philadelphia, Pennsylvania.  He coached the team from 1971 to 2010. Ellis has been inducted to the International Swim Coaches Association Hall of Fame, and received the President's Award from the International Swimming Hall of Fame.  The 2007 feature film Pride is based on his life story.

Background

Ellis grew up in Pittsburgh, Pennsylvania.  He graduated from Westinghouse High School of Pittsburgh Public Schools. His name is on the Westinghouse High School Wall of Fame. He swam competitively in high school, and at the collegiate level for Cheney State, where he also studied mathematics.

Career

After graduating from Cheney State, Ellis wanted to get a job as a teacher, but was not able to secure a position.  Having previously worked as a lifeguard, he became a water safety instructor at a local recreation center in West Philadelphia. He later became a math teacher at a high school in Philadelphia.

In 1971, Ellis formed the PDR (Pride, Determination, Resilience or Philadelphia Department of Recreation) swim team at the Marcus Foster Recreation Center in Nicetown, a neighborhood in Philadelphia. The team is recognized as being the first African-American swim team in the country, and Ellis is credited with helping break down stereotypes and diversifying the sport of swimming.  His teams were highly competitive locally and nationally. They gained national recognition as a premier training program, sending team members to the swimming trials for every U.S. Olympic team from 1992 to 2007.  Many talented swimmers, like Michael Norment, came to swim for Ellis' team because of his strong reputation as a coach.  Norment became the first black swimmer on the U.S. national team,  and later became a swimming coach himself. Ellis coached the PDR team from 1971 until 2010.  

Since 2010, Ellis has been the coach of the Salvation Army Kroc Aquatics (SAKA) program located in the Salvation Army's Philadelphia-based Kroc Center. He was influential in designing the pool at the center.

Awards and recognition 
In May 2007, Ellis received the President's Award from the International Swimming Hall of Fame. In 2015, he was named to the "List of the 30 Most Influential People In Swimming Over the Past 30 Years," selected by USA Swimming and Speedo.  Ellis was inducted to the American Swimming Coaches Association Hall of Fame in 2019.

In 2007, the feature film Pride was released, which portrays Jim Ellis and his struggles to establish the PDR team.

See also
Inspirational/motivational instructors/mentors portrayed in films
 Pride (2007 film)

External links 

 Swim Swam podcast - Interview with Jim Ellis

References

Living people
American swimming coaches
1948 births
20th-century African-American people
People from Pittsburgh